Josie Simpson is an Australian female cyclo-cross cyclist. She represented Australia in the women's elite event at the 2016 UCI Cyclo-cross World Championships in Heusden-Zolder.

References

Year of birth missing (living people)
Living people
Cyclo-cross cyclists
Australian female cyclists
Place of birth missing (living people)